Takali Bhan is a small village in Shrirampur taluka, Ahmednagar district, Maharashtra, India.

References 

Villages in Ahmednagar district